Stepping Out is a German competitive dancing talent show that aired on RTL on 11 September 2015 and was hosted by Daniel Hartwich & Sylvie Meis. The judging panel consisted of Jorge González, Motsi Mabuse and Joachim Llambi.

Unlike other similar dance shows, the dancers were all couples in real life, not one celebrity plus one professional dancer.

Contestants

Scoring chart

Average score chart
This table only counts dances scored on a 30-point scale; bonus scores are excluded.

Highest and lowest scoring performances
The best and worst performances in each dance according to the judges' 30-point scale are as follows:

Dance chart

2015 German television series debuts
RTL (German TV channel) original programming
German reality television series
Dance competition television shows
German-language television shows